Claudio Cassano (born 22 July 2003) is an Italian professional footballer who plays as forward for Serie A club Roma.

Club career 
Claudio Cassano was born in Trani, Apulia, starting to play football in Barletta, then playing for Bisceglie as an under-15, before moving to AS Roma in 2018.

Proving to be a prolific goalscorer with the Primavera in 2022–23, he began to train with Mourinho's first team, making his first bench appearance with the professionals on the 13 October 2022, during the 1–1 away Europa League draw to Betis.

Honours

Club
AS Roma

 Campionato Primavera runner-up:

References

External links

2003 births
Living people
Italian footballers
Association football forwards
People from Trani